Notosuchidae is a Gondwanan family of notosuchians. They were small-bodied terrestrial crocodyliforms that lived during the Late Cretaceous.

References

Early Cretaceous crocodylomorphs
Terrestrial crocodylomorphs
Late Cretaceous crocodylomorphs
Turonian first appearances
Santonian extinctions
Prehistoric reptile families